Cross-country skiing at the 1999 Asian Winter Games took place in the Provincial Nordic venue, around the resort town of Yongpyong, Kangwon, South Korea, with six events contested — three each for men and women.

Schedule

Medalists

Men

Women

Medal table

Participating nations
A total of 49 athletes from 7 nations competed in cross-country skiing at the 1999 Asian Winter Games:

References
Results of the Fourth Asian Winter Games
Chinese take lead in the Asian Games

External links
Results

 
Asian Winter Games
1999 Asian Winter Games events
1999